Sir Gerard Spencer Summers (27 October 1902 – 19 January 1976) was a British Conservative politician. He was born in Flintshire, Wales in 1902 and educated at Wellington School and Trinity College, Cambridge. He became a director of the family business of John Summers & Sons, steelmakers.

During the Second World War (1940-1945) he was the elected Member of Parliament (MP) for Northampton and appointed the Director-General of Regional Organisation at the Ministry of Supply. In 1945, he was the Secretary for Overseas Trade in the post-war caretaker government.

In 1946 he also assumed the role of first chairman of the Outward Bound Trust. He was also a Governor of UWC Atlantic College from its opening in 1962–76, and was on the foundation committee for three years prior to its opening.

He was MP for Aylesbury from 1950 until his retirement in 1970. He was knighted in 1956  and selected High Sheriff of Northamptonshire for 1974–75.

Personal life

Spencer Summers married Jean Pickering in London in 1930. Their son, Shane, was a racing driver who competed in a few non-Championship Formula One races, but was accidentally killed at the age of 24 when practicing for the 1961 Silver City Trophy at the Brands Hatch circuit in Kent. Sir Gerard Spencer Summers died near Banbury, Oxfordshire in 1976, aged 73.

References

External links
 
 

1902 births
1976 deaths
Conservative Party (UK) MPs for English constituencies
High Sheriffs of Northamptonshire
Knights Bachelor
Politicians awarded knighthoods
UK MPs 1935–1945
UK MPs 1950–1951
UK MPs 1951–1955
UK MPs 1955–1959
UK MPs 1959–1964
UK MPs 1964–1966
UK MPs 1966–1970
Ministers in the Churchill caretaker government, 1945